This page lists individuals and organisations who publicly expressed an opinion regarding the 2020 Italian constitutional referendum.

Yes

Members of the government and institutions

Presidents of the Senate

Presidents of the Chamber of Deputies
 Roberto Fico, President of the Chamber of Deputies (M5S) (2018–today)

Prime Ministers
Giuseppe Conte, 58th Prime Minister (Independent) (2018–2021)

Enrico Letta, 55th Prime Minister (PD) (2013–2014)

Ministers
 Luigi Di Maio, Minister of Foreign Affairs (M5S) (2019–today)
 Riccardo Fraccaro, Secretary of the Council of Ministers (M5S) (2019–today)

 Mara Carfagna, Minister for Equal Opportunities (FI) (2008–2011)
 Mariastella Gelmini, Minister of Education, University and Research (FI) (2008–2011)
 Maurizio Martina, Minister of Agricultural, Food and Forestry Policies (PD) (2014–2018)
 Marco Minniti, Minister of the Interior (PD) (2016–2018)
 Matteo Salvini, Minister of the Interior (Lega) (2018–2019)

Members of local governments

Presidents of Regions

 Stefano Bonaccini, President of Emilia-Romagna (PD) (2014–today)
 Giovanni Toti, President of Liguria (C!) (2015–today)
 Nicola Zingaretti, President of Lazio (PD) (2013–today)

Mayors of main cities

Dario Nardella, Mayor of Florence (PD) (2014–today)

Members of the Parliament

Members of the Chamber of Deputies

Members of the Senate of the Republic

International figures

Members of the European Parliament

From other European Union member states

Notable individuals

Journalists, commentators, and political satirists
 Giuliano Ferrara
 Claudio Cerasa
 Beppe Severgnini
 Antonio Polito
 Massimo Giletti
 Giovanni Floris

University and academic figures

Constitutional judges and lawyer
Carlo Fusaro, jurist
Valerio Onida, former President of the Constitutional Court of Italy
Lorenza Carlassare, jurist
Stefano Ceccanti, jurist and senator for the Democratic Party;

Others
 Tito Boeri, former President of the National Institute for Social Security (2014–2019)

Celebrities

Actors and film directors

Singers and producers

Writers and artists

Organisations

Committees

Main political parties

Minor parties

European political parties

Trade unions and business organisations

Newspapers

Periodicals

Other organisations

No

Members of the government and institutions

Presidents of the Senate

 Pietro Grasso, 21st President of the Senate of the Republic (LeU) (2013–2018)
 Marcello Pera, 18th President of the Senate of the Republic (FI) (2001–2006)

Presidents of the Chamber of Deputies

 Laura Boldrini, 14th President of the Chamber of Deputies (PD) (2013–2018)
 Pier Ferdinando Casini, 11th President of the Chamber of Deputies (CpE) (2001–2006)
 Luciano Violante, 10th President of the Chamber of Deputies (PD) (1996–2001)

Prime Ministers

 Ciriaco De Mita, 47th Prime Minister of Italy (IP) (1988–1989)
 Romano Prodi, 52nd Prime Minister of Italy (PD) (1996–1998; 2006–2008)

Ministers

 Emma Bonino, Minister of Foreign Affairs (+E) (2013–2014)
 Renato Brunetta, Minister of Public Administration and Innovation (FI) (2008–2011)
 Carlo Calenda, Minister of Economic Development (A) (2016–2018)
 Giuseppe Fioroni, Minister of Public Education (PD) (2006–2008)
 Gianfranco Rotondi, Minister for the Implementation of the Government Program (FI) (2008–2011)
 Walter Veltroni, Minister for Cultural Heritage (PD) (1996–1998)

Members of local governments

Presidents of Regions
 Vincenzo De Luca, President of Campania (PD) (2015–today)
 Vito Bardi, President of Basilicata (FI) (2019–today)
 Attilio Fontana, President of Lombardy (Lega) (2018–today)

 Marcello Pittella, President of Basilicata (PD) (2013–2019)

Mayors of main cities
 Luigi De Magistris, Mayor of Naples
Giorgio Gori, Mayor of Bergamo (PD)

Members of the Parliament

Members of the Chamber of Deputies

Members of the Senate of the Republic

International figures

Members of the European Parliament

From other European Union member states

Notable individuals

Journalists, commentators, and political satirists
Pierluigi Battista
Stefano Feltri

University and academic figures
 Alfonso Celotto, constitutional law professor at the Sapienza University of Rome
 Francesco Clemente,  public comparative law professor at the University of Perugia
 Massimo Luciani, constitutional law professor at the Sapienza University of Rome
 Vincenzo Musacchio, jurist
 Marco Plutino, constitutional law professor at the University of Cassino
Tomaso Montanari
 Massimo Villone, constitutional law professor at the University of Naples Federico II

Constitutional judges and lawyers
 Sabino Cassese, former judge of the Constitutional Court of Italy
 Giuseppe Tesauro, former President of the Constitutional Court of Italy

Others
Marco Bentivogli, former secretary of the Italian Federation of Metal Mechanics (2014–2020)
Sardines movement

Celebrities

Actors and film directors
 Massimo Ghini
 Cristina Comencini
 Sabina Guzzanti
 Gene Gnocchi
 Sabrina Ferilli
 Paolo Virzì
 Ivano Marescotti
 Luca Bizzarri

Singers and producers
 Roberto Vecchioni

Writers and artists
 Roberto Saviano
 Sandro Veronesi
 Michela Murgia
 Oliviero Toscani
 Makkox

Athletes
 Alessandro Costacurta

Organisations

Committees

Main political parties

Minor parties

European political parties

Trade unions and business organisations

Newspapers

Periodicals

Other organisations

Officially endorse neither side

Members of the government and institutions

Notable individuals

Constitutional judges and lawyer
Gustavo Zagrebelsky, former President of the Constitutional Court of Italy

Organisations

Main political parties

References

Constitutional referendums in Italy
2020 elections in Italy
Political endorsements